The Pakistan women's national judo team represents Pakistan in international judo competitions. It is administered by the Pakistan Judo Federation (PJF). Members of the team compete in competitions including regional games (South Asian Games).

Events
Pakistan has sent a team to the following events:

Championships
 Asia-Pacific Judo Championships: 2019
Asian Judo Championships: 2010, 
Commonwealth Judo Championships: 2018 
 World Judo Championships : 2010, 2019

Games
 South Asian Games: 2010 to date

History 
In 2010, Pakistan sent its first ever team to the World Judo Championships held in Tokyo, Japan. The five member team included Fouzia Mumtaz. At the Commonwealth Judo Championships held in Jaipur, India in 2018, a five member women's team was part of the first full fledged 19 member contingent sent to compete internationally.

Members

Medals

References

Judo
Women's sport in Pakistan